The Museum Ulm (Museum der Stadt Ulm), founded in 1924, is a museum for art, archeology, urban and cultural history in Ulm, Germany.

Exhibits range from prehistoric and early archaeological finds of the Ulm region (including the lion-man statuette) to Late (International) Gothic and Renaissance paintings and sculptures made in Ulm and Upper Swabia. Collections of 16th- to 19th-century artisan works by Ulm's handicraft guilds are also presented. Conservator and university professor Julius Baum became the museum’s founding director and its first art historian on 1 April 1924. According to his successor Erwin Treu, "this started the real history" as "an institute emerged from a junk room".

Exhibits

Prehistory 
The museum's permanent archaeological exhibition was redesigned in 2014 after further fragments of a 35,000 to 41,000-year-old mammoth ivory sculpture were recovered at the original site in the Lone Valley. This lion-man figurine is a human with the head and the limbs of a lion. In an extremely complex restoration process in 2012/13, the figurine was completely re-assembled from over 300 fragments and has since revealed new details.

In addition to the lion-man from the Hohlenstein-Stadel cave, the prehistoric environment of the Swabian Jura mountains is also documented. Numerous exhibits from the Upper Paleolithic to the Neolithic period, including the finds from the neighboring Bockstein Cave are shown. There is, above all, the exhibit of a Neanderthal thigh bone, the only substantial piece of evidence of this species ever found in Baden-Württemberg. Also on display are the artefacts of Mesolithic burials of the Bockstein Cave and the Hohlenstein-Stadel.

Middle Ages and modernity 
Many works of important representatives of the Late Gothic Ulm School are presented in the museum. A chronology of the region's International Gothic period has been demonstrated, supported by valuable exhibits beginning with Meister Hartmann and Hans Multscher to Martin Schaffner, Michel Erhart, Hans Schüchlin, Jörg Stocker, Niklaus Weckmann, Bartholomäus Zeitblom to Daniel Mauch. The Late Gothic cultural landscape of Upper Swabia and the Allgäu is illustrated by the works of Bernhard Strigel and others, which allows valuable direct style studies and comparisons.

Representative works of artists of the 20th and 21st centuries also belong to the Ulm collection, among them Paul Klee, Ernst Ludwig Kirchner, August Macke and Franz Marc. A highlight is the superb international Kurt Fried Collection. Amongst publisher Kurt Fried's 1959 to 1981 private collection the visitor will find works by Frank Stella, Mark Rothko, Roy Lichtenstein, Günther Uecker, Yves Klein, Daniel Spoerri, Josef Albers, Max Bill and Gerhard Richter.

The museum presents a variety of exhibitions in order to make the complicated relations among Ulm's Late Gothic artists come to light. The focus of research is on the Ulm families of artists around Hans Multscher, Jörg Syrlin the Elder, Jörg Syrlin the Younger, Michel Erhart, Gregor Erhart and Daniel Mauch.

Since 14 November 1999 there has been a new presentation in the extension building on the subject of European and American Art after 1945. In addition, 20th-century graphic art and modernity are presented in temporary exhibitions.

Galleries

Associated groups 
The Friends of the Ulm Museum was founded in 1982 in Ulm. Its members support the particular concerns of the Ulm Museum and promote its scientific work.

Special exhibitions 
A selection of the important exhibitions at the museum:
 1995: Der Löwenmensch. Der gegenläufige Spannungsbogen von gestern und heute: der Löwenmensch, 32.000 Jahre zurück: zur neuesten Technologie: das Jüngste und das Älteste. In Zusammenarbeit mit dem Museum für Moderne Kunst München, 20. Januar – 5. März
 2003: Tamara Grcic – Videos, Filme, Installationen, 20. Juli – 28. September
 2003: Ulmer Bürgerinnen & Söflinger Klosterfrauen, 30. August – 23. November
 2004: Carol Rama – Appassionata, 12. September – 14. November
 2004: Arno Schmidt, Vier mal Vier – Fotografien aus Bargfeld, 4. Dezember 2004 bis 30. Januar 2005
 2005: Emil Nolde, Blickkontakte, frühe Portraits, 2. April – 15. August
 2005: Leiko Ikemura, Skulptur-Malerei-Zeichnung, 12. Februar – 24. April
 2006: Charlotte Salomon, Leben? Oder Theater? In Zusammenarbeit mit dem Joods Historisch Museum, Amsterdam, (Stationen: 16. März – 3. Juni 2007 Taxispalais, Innsbruck; 22. Oktober 2006 bis 11. Februar 2007 Ulmer Museum; 12. Oktober 2005 bis 15. Januar 2006 Sprengel Museum, Hannover; 11. März 2005 bis 16. Mai 2005 Kunstsammlungen Chemnitz; 18. Juni – 22. August 2004 Das Städel, Frankfurt)
 2006: Karin Kneffel, Verführung und Distanz // Seduction and Distance, (Stationen: Mönchehaus Museum, Goslar, Museum Sinclair-Haus, Bad Homburg)
 2007: Die Kunst- und Wunderkammer des Christoph Weickmann, Reflektionen über eine Sammlung, 17. Februar – 29. April 2007
 2008: Michaela Melián: Speicher, 19. April – 22. Juni 2008
 2009: Kosmos und Marionette. Paul Klee und die Romantik, 8. März – 17. Mai 2009
 2011: Die Weissenhofer: Radical Research – Die Wurzeln der Wissenschaft, 3. April – 29. Mai 2011
 2015: MACK. Das Licht meiner Farben, 11. September 2015 bis 10. Januar 2016
 2017: Walt Disney – Fantasien werden niemals alt, 20. Mai – 17. September 2017
 2017: Erwarten Sie Wunder! Das Museum als Kuriositätenkabinett und Wunderkammer, 20. Mai – 15. Oktober 2017

References 

1924 establishments in Germany
History museums in Germany
Archaeological museums in Germany
Art museums established in 1924
Tourist attractions in Baden-Württemberg
Museums in Baden-Württemberg
Organisations based in Ulm